Third Eye is a Philippine horror and suspense TV series aired on TV5. The series top-billed by Eula Caballero in the title role, alongside Lorna Tolentino, Victor Silayan, and Eddie Garcia. It premiered on July 29, 2012, and ended on October 21, 2012.

The series is inspired by characters based on Philippine folklore, mythology and pop culture.

Plot
The story revolves on Cassandra, a young girl who investigates the mysterious disappearance of her boyfriend. In her quest to find and save him, she discovers her ability to see creatures of a different realm.

Cast and characters

Main cast
Eula Caballero as Cassandra

Supporting cast
Lorna Tolentino as Rosanna
Daniel Matsunaga as Lucas
Eddie Garcia† as Lolo Gimo
Victor Silayan as Adrian
Jenny Miller as Sonia
Clint Gabo as Dongbi 
Darlene Alquintos as Yuri

See also
List of programs broadcast by TV5 (Philippines)
List of programs aired by TV5 (Philippines)
Cassandra: Warrior Angel

References

External links
 

2012 Philippine television series debuts
2012 Philippine television series endings
TV5 (Philippine TV network) original programming
Philippine horror fiction television series
Filipino-language television shows